"Army of One" is the 39th episode of the HBO original series The Sopranos and the finale of the show's third season. It was written by David Chase and Lawrence Konner, and directed by John Patterson, and originally aired on May 20, 2001.

Starring
 James Gandolfini as Tony Soprano
 Lorraine Bracco as Dr. Jennifer Melfi 
 Edie Falco as Carmela Soprano
 Michael Imperioli as Christopher Moltisanti
 Dominic Chianese as Corrado Soprano, Jr.
 Steven Van Zandt as Silvio Dante
 Tony Sirico as Paulie Gualtieri
 Jamie-Lynn Sigler as Meadow Soprano
 Robert Iler as Anthony Soprano, Jr.
 Drea de Matteo as Adriana La Cerva
 Aida Turturro as Janice Soprano
 John Ventimiglia as Artie Bucco
 Federico Castelluccio as Furio Giunta
 Robert Funaro as Eugene Pontecorvo
 Kathrine Narducci as Charmaine Bucco
 Steven R. Schirripa as Bobby Baccalieri
 Joe Pantoliano as Ralph Cifaretto

Guest starring

Synopsis
A.J. is expelled from high school for stealing answers to a test. Tony, enraged, decides to send him to military school. A.J. is interviewed by the administrator of the Hudson Military Institute, who lays out the rigorous schedule for students. Carmela believes they will train him to be a "professional killer"; Tony counters that he will be learning discipline and respect. As A.J. prepares to leave home, he puts on his dress uniform; both parents sincerely admire his appearance, but he looks at himself in the mirror and, in tears, asks not to be sent away. As his mother is adjusting his uniform, he suffers a panic attack and collapses. Tony tells Dr. Melfi that his son has inherited his "putrid gene", and he cannot send him to military school.

Seeking intelligence about the DiMeo crime family, the FBI decide to go through a woman and send Agent Deborah Ciccerone on an undercover mission to befriend Adriana. Danielle, as she calls herself, easily gets talking to Adriana in a dress shop.

Paulie is in dispute with Ralphie about the division of proceeds from a robbery and insists on a sit-down. He claims $50,000; to his shock and dismay, Tony awards him only $12,000. Paulie later speaks quietly to Johnny about his dissatisfaction with Tony, and offers his services to Johnny's boss, Carmine Lupertazzi.

Jackie Jr. is forced into hiding at a Boonton housing project after his failed robbery at Eugene's poker game. He calls Tony, pleading for help; Tony rebuffs him. Tony again expresses his confidence to Ralphie that, as captain, he knows what to do, but he must decide in a "timely fashion." Ralphie makes his decision: when Jackie leaves the apartment to get some air, he is shot in the back of the head by Vito. It is said that he was killed in a drug dealers' dispute.

At Jackie's visitation, Meadow cries uncontrollably when she sees him in his casket. Tony and Carmela are embarrassed when Rosalie notes the low attendance rate; the funeral has coincided with Super Bowl Sunday, a busy betting time. At the funeral, Silvio and  Christopher are arrested for illegal gambling. During the reception at Rosalie's, Meadow and Kelli, Rosalie's daughter, argue bitterly about who killed Jackie. Meadow seems to believe it was a drug dealer;  Kelli is sure it was an Italian.

At the wake at Nuovo Vesuvio, Silvio and Chris enter, having quickly made bail. Ralphie has begun to distance himself from Rosalie; he and Janice ostentatiously embrace. Junior, no longer under house arrest, sings the Italian love song "Core 'ngrato", moving some of the men to tears. Meadow, drunk, throws pieces of bread at Junior while he is singing, then quickly leaves when she sees that her father has noticed. He confronts her in the street; she tearfully denounces the funeral proceedings as "bullshit" and runs away. Tony returns and puts his arms round A.J. and Carmela as they listen to Junior sing.

Title references
 "An Army of One" was a slogan used in United States Army recruitment advertisements in the early 2000s, and was discussed by the Sopranos when they met with officials at the military school they considered sending A.J. to.
 This could also refer to Jackie's self-directed efforts to get himself into the DiMeo crime family.

First appearances
 Agent Deborah Ciccerone: An F.B.I. agent assigned to go undercover and become Adriana's "new best friend".
 Marianucci Gualtieri: Paulie's mother who moves into Green Grove nursing home.

Deceased
 Jackie Aprile, Jr.: shot in the back of the head by Vito Spatafore.

Production
 The Super Bowl referenced throughout this episode between the "Giants" and "Ravens" (heard being discussed on a television pregame show and the radio) establishes the events as occurring in late January 2001.
 This is the last episode to feature the World Trade Center in the title sequence due to the subsequent terrorist attacks.
 The episode initially aired with Fairuza Balk in the role of Agent Deborah Ciccerone until she was recast; the scenes were replaced on re-runs and the VHS and DVD releases.

References to prior episodes
 Tony and Carmela watch a commercial for Dr. Fried's urology clinic, whose production was featured in the previous episode, "Amour Fou". Dr. Fried tends to Furio's gun injury.
 In a scene where Tony and Carmela are having a fight, she says that "boys his age still kill frogs and small animals." Tony wonders if it could have been A.J. who blew up the Cusamanos' "Binky" with a Cherry bomb. A.J. admitted blowing up frogs with explosives in the season one episode "Meadowlands."

Cultural reference
 In the opening scene, A.J. reads an issue of the comic book Freex.
 When Tony saw A. J. in full uniform, he remarks: "Sgt. Bilko!"

Music
 The organ music played during Jackie's wake is "Ombra mai fu" from Handel's opera Serse. 
 When A.J. calls Meadow at Columbia, Creeper Lagoon's song "Wonderful Love" can be heard playing in the background.
 During Jackie's wake, Junior's performance of "Core 'ngrato" ("Ungrateful Heart") was sung by Dominic Chianese himself.
 The song sung by Junior before "Core 'ngrato", while he is at the table, is "Malafemmena".
 The French song that follows "Core 'ngrato" ("Ungrateful Heart") is "Parlez-moi d'amour" performed by Lucienne Boyer and written by Jean Lenoir.
 The song in Spanish that follows the French version of "Core 'ngrato" ("Ungrateful Heart") is "La Enramada" a Bolero written by Graciela Olmos and performed by Los Tres Ases (The Three Aces).
 The song played over the end credits is "#8" (unofficially titled [blur] aka [circles])  by Aphex Twin, from his album, Selected Ambient Works Volume II.
As Meadow is tossing bread at Junior, Meadow sings a line from Britney Spears' song, "Oops!... I Did It Again" (the original recording of that song was previously featured in "Employee of the Month").
The song that follows Lucienne Boyer's "Parlez-moi d'amour" is called "Wondering" by American music composer and director Nathan Wang.

External links
"Army of One" at HBO

The Sopranos (season 3) episodes
2001 American television episodes
Television episodes about funerals
Television episodes written by David Chase
Television episodes directed by John Patterson (director)